The Aero Commander 100, various models of which were known as the Darter Commander and Lark Commander was an American light aircraft produced in the 1960s. It was a high-wing monoplane of conventional design, equipped with fixed tricycle undercarriage.

Design and development
The aircraft was originally designed by Volaircraft, first flying in 1960.  The firm marketed the original three-seat version as the Volaire 1035 and a four-seat version with a more powerful engine as the Volaire 1050 before North American Rockwell purchased all rights to the design on July 12, 1965, for production by its Aero Commander division.  Production of the Darter Commander version continued until 1969 and of the revised Lark Commander until 1971 (by which time, Rockwell had dropped the Aero Commander brand name).

A Volaire 1050 was exhibited at the 1966 Hanover Air Show and later sold to Finland.  Other examples of the type were exported to Australia and Canada.

Finding the light aircraft market too competitive for its liking, Rockwell ceased production of the Lark Commander in 1971 and sold the rights to all versions of the aircraft to Phoenix Aircraft of Euclid, Ohio, but this company never actually put it into production.

Variants

Volaircraft
 Model 10 – prototypes
 Volaire 1035 – three-seat production version powered by Lycoming O-290
 Volaire 1050 – four-seat production version powered by Lycoming O-320

Aero Commander/Rockwell

 Aero Commander 100 – alias Volaire 1050
 Aero Commander 100A – alias Volaire 1035
 Darter Commander – 100 with revised windows and other minor modifications
 Lark Commander 180 – revised aerodynamics, with swept fin and rudder and  Lycoming O-360-A2F engine. Production from 1968.

Specifications (Darter Commander)

See also

References

Notes

Bibliography

 Taylor, John W. R. Jane's All The World's Aircraft 1969–70. London:Jane's Yearbooks, 1969.

External links

 The Volaircraft Darter – Aviation History Online Museum

1960s United States civil utility aircraft
100
High-wing aircraft
Single-engined tractor aircraft
Aircraft first flown in 1960